Laurel Run is a borough in Luzerne County, Pennsylvania, United States. The population was 560 at the 2020 census.

History 

Laurel Run was incorporated as a borough in 1881. The borough is home to one of the oldest continuing motorsport events in Pennsylvania. Since 1906, the annual Giants Despair Hillclimb has challenged motorists to race uphill on a one-mile stretch of East Northampton Street.

In 1915, a mine fire started in the borough's Red Ash mine. The mine was excavated and, although the fire was declared extinguished in 1973, the fire is still burning. Approximately 166 homes, two grocery stores, a church, a school, and a lumberyard were razed and relocated through a program administered by the Appalachian Regional Commission.

Geography 
Laurel Run is located at  (41.217222, -75.841456).

The borough is sparsely populated. Most of Laurel Run consists of mountainous forests. Laurel Run, a tributary of Mill Creek, flows through much of the borough.

Demographics 

At the 2000 census there were 723 people, 277 households, and 188 families living in the borough. The population density was 140.9 people per square mile (54.4/km2). There were 292 housing units at an average density of 56.9 per square mile (22.0/km2).
The racial makeup of the borough was 99.45% White, 0.28% African American, 0.14% Native American, and 0.14% from two or more races. Hispanic or Latino of any race were 0.28% of the population.

There were 277 households, 31.4% had children under the age of 18 living with them, 54.2% were married couples living together, 7.9% had a female householder with no husband present, and 31.8% were non-families. 27.4% of households were made up of individuals, and 9.0% were one person aged 65 or older. The average household size was 2.43 and the average family size was 3.01.

The age distribution was 19.4% under the age of 18, 8.3% from 18 to 24, 30.7% from 25 to 44, 29.9% from 45 to 64, and 11.8% 65 or older. The median age was 40 years. For every 100 females there were 112.0 males. For every 100 females age 18 and over, there were 113.6 males.

The median household income was $35,781 and the median family income  was $40,455. Males had a median income of $28,611 versus $24,500 for females. The per capita income for the borough was $17,066. About 8.8% of families and 8.5% of the population were below the poverty line, including 11.0% of those under age 18 and 11.8% of those age 65 or over.

References

External links

Populated places established in 1881
Boroughs in Luzerne County, Pennsylvania
1881 establishments in Pennsylvania